History of Georgia may refer to:

 History of Georgia (country)
 History of Georgia (U.S. state)